Robert Lyle Knepper (born July 8, 1959) is an American actor best known for his role as Theodore "T-Bag" Bagwell in the Fox drama series Prison Break (2005–2009, 2017), Samuel Sullivan in the final season of the NBC series Heroes (2009–2010),  Angus McDonough in The CW series iZombie (2015–2018) and Rodney Mitchum in Showtime's revival of Twin Peaks (2017). He has appeared in films such as Hitman (2007), Transporter 3 (2008) and Jack Reacher: Never Go Back (2016).

Early life 
Knepper was born in Fremont, Ohio, and raised in Maumee, Ohio, the son of Pat Deck and Donald Knepper, a veterinarian. He was interested in acting from an early age, due to his mother's involvement as a props-handler at a community theater. After graduating from Maumee High School in 1977, he attended Northwestern University; during this time, Knepper obtained professional roles in plays in Chicago. Nearing the completion of his degree, Knepper quit Northwestern and went to New York City, where he continued to work in theater.

Career 
Although Knepper did not intended to work in film and television projects, he began his television and film career in 1986 with The Paper Chase and That's Life!. Knepper went on to have larger roles in such films as Wild Thing, Young Guns II, When the Bough Breaks and Everyone Says I Love You. He made appearances on such television series as The Twilight Zone, Star Trek: The Next Generation, ER and Law & Order. In 2005, after a recurring role on the HBO series Carnivàle, Knepper was cast in his best-known role, as Theodore "T-Bag" Bagwell in Prison Break. The series received positive reviews upon release, and "T-Bag" is often considered to be one of the greatest television villains of all time. During his time on Prison Break, Knepper starred in a number of films; Good Night, and Good Luck, Hitman, Transporter 3 and The Day the Earth Stood Still.

After Prison Break ended in 2009, Knepper was cast as villain Samuel Sullivan in the fourth and final season of Heroes. After this, he went on to have a recurring role in Stargate Universe in 2010. He guest-starred on season six of Criminal Minds as Rhett Walden, a serial killer. The same year he played the titular character in the film adaptation of Burning Daylight.

In addition, Knepper appeared as Honolulu Police Internal Affairs detective Rex Coughlin in two episodes of Hawaii Five-0.

In 2011, he reprised his role of T-Bag in one episode of the A&E series Breakout Kings. The next year, he played Frank Sinatra in My Way, a biopic of Claude François, a French pop singer who wrote the song "Comme d'habitude", the original version of Sinatra's song "My Way".

Knepper was cast in the 2013 television series Cult as Roger Reeves, an actor playing Billy Grimm on a show called Cult. The show was canceled after only one season. The same year, he appeared in R.I.P.D., Percy Jackson: Sea of Monsters and guest starred on the television series The Blacklist (episode: "The Courier"). At the end of 2013, the TNT series Mob City premiered, in which Knepper played gangster Sid Rothman. In 2014, Knepper guest starred in episodes of Arrow and The Flash as master hacker and time-and-motion study expert William Tockman / Clock King.

Since 2015, Knepper has had a recurring role on iZombie as Angus McDonough, the estranged and abusive father of Blaine DeBeers (David Anders). It was announced in July 2017 that Knepper would be promoted to the show's main cast for season 4.

Knepper was cast in the reboot of David Lynch's Twin Peaks as gangster Rodney Mitchum. He later voiced the audiobook adaptation for the tie-in epistolary novel of the show called The Secret History of Twin Peaks.

Personal life 
Knepper has a son, Benjamin Peter (born 2002), with his first wife, Tory Herald. He married his second wife, Nadine Kary, in 2013.

Sexual assault allegations 

On November 8, 2017, costume designer Susan Bertram accused Knepper of sexual assault on the set of the film Gas Food Lodging in 1991. Knepper denied the allegations in a since-deleted Instagram post. On February 28, 2018, Bertram's lawyers announced she was filing a defamation lawsuit against Knepper in Los Angeles County Superior Court in the wake of his denials, seeking damages in a jury trial. Knepper's lawyers denied that he defamed Bertram. On June 1, 2021, Bertram's attorney announced that the lawsuit had been settled; the terms have not been publicized.

Four additional allegations taking place between 1983 and 2013 were made by women against Knepper on December 5, 2017, including an accusation of rape in Vancouver in 2010. All of the allegations were denied by Knepper.

Late in 2017, in the wake of these accusations, The CW conducted an internal inquiry. Finding no evidence of misconduct transpiring on the set, it was announced he would be remaining on iZombie. On January 12, 2018, it was announced that the studio had conducted a second investigation. CW president Mark Pedowitz stated, "Again, the investigation related to the set and his behavior on the set. They found no wrongdoing on the set." Pedowitz elaborated that Knepper had signed on for a single season and that his exit from the series had already been planned.

Filmography

Film

Television

Video games

Theatre 

 A Little Night Music – Northwestern University (1977)
 The Ruling Class – Northwestern University (1979)
 The Merchant of Venice – Northwestern University (1979–1980)
 Ties – Chicago (1981)
 Class Enemy – Evanston, Illinois (1981)
 Lakeboat – Chicago (1982)
 The Life and Adventures of Nicholas Nickleby – Chicago (1982)
 Dark of the Moon – Sarasota (1983)
 Life Signals – Sarasota (1983)
 Sherlock Holmes – Sarasota (1983)
 The Philanthropist – New York (1983)
 Savage Amusement – New York (1984)
 Romance – New York (1984)
 The Person I Once Was – Louisville, Kentucky (1984)
 The Very Last Lover of the River Cane – Louisville, Kentucky (1985)
 Available Light – Louisville, Kentucky (1985)
 Groves of Academe – Cluj, Romania (1985)
 A Midsummer Night's Dream – New York (1987)
 Romeo and Juliet – New York (1988)
 The Legend of Oedipus – Williamstown,  Massachusetts (1988)
 Les Liaisons Dangereuses – Williamstown, Massachusetts (1988)
 Nebraska – La Jolla (1989)
 Ice Cream With Hot Fudge – New York (1990)
 Bobby, Can You Hear Me? – Waterford, Connecticut (1990)
 Buster Comes Through – Waterford, Connecticut (1990)
 Lake No Bottom – New York (1990)
 Dinosaur Dreams – Waterford, Connecticut (1991)
 Home Grown – Waterford, Connecticut (1991)
 Orestes – Los Angeles (1992)
 Salomé – New York (1992)
 Pal Joey – Boston (1992)
 Sweet Bird of Youth – London (1994)
 Pride's Crossing – San Diego (1997)
 The Summer Moon – Seattle (1998)

References

External links 

 
 Robert Knepper's interview at CynbytheSea

Male actors from Ohio
American male film actors
American male stage actors
American male television actors
American people of German descent
People from Fremont, Ohio
21st-century American male actors
20th-century American male actors
1959 births
Living people
People from Maumee, Ohio